Wayna Tunari (Aymara and Quechua wayna young) is a mountain in the Tunari mountain range of the Bolivian Andes which reaches a height of approximately . It is situated in the Cochabamba Department, Ayopaya Province, Morochata Municipality, and in the Quillacollo Province, Vinto Municipality. It lies northwest of Tunari.

See also 
 Jatun Q'asa
 Puma Apachita

References 

Mountains of Cochabamba Department